The District of Columbia Public Charter School Board (DC PCSB) is the regulatory authority and sole authorizer of all public charter schools in the District of Columbia, in the United States. It provides oversight to 69 independently-run nonprofits (also referred to as local education agencies or LEAs) and 135 public charter schools which educate more than 45,000 students living in every ward of the city (48% of all DC public school students). The Board is tasked with approving, monitoring, and evaluating schools, creating policies and conditions to empower educators to do their best work, and actively engaging families, schools, and communities to inform decision-making.

History
DC PCSB was created in 1996 by the District of Columbia School Reform Act of 1995 as a second, independent authorizer of public charter schools in the District of Columbia. In 2006, the District of Columbia State Board of Education voted to relinquish its authorizing responsibilities for charter schools and in 2007, the Council of the District of Columbia passed legislation granting the Mayor of the District of Columbia direct authority over the traditional public school system. With that vote, the Board became the sole authority, led by a seven-member volunteer board, for public charter schools within the District of Columbia.

Mission 
DC public charter schools are environments where all students, especially those in historically marginalized groups, thrive. As DC’s sole charter authorizer, the DC Public Charter School Board:

 Approves, monitors, and evaluates schools, with an emphasis on equity and academic excellence 

 Creates policies and conditions to empower educators to do their best work in service of students

 Actively engages families, schools, and communities to inform decision-making

Leadership
The DC Public Charter School Board is led by Dr. Michelle J. Walker-Davis, who joined as Executive Director in August 2020.

Governance 
The DC PCSB Board is a seven-member volunteer Board responsible for approving new schools, conducting oversight of schools while in operation, and revoking a school's charter if it fails to meet its performance goals.

DC Public Charter School Board Members 

 Lea Crusey (Chair) - Ward 6
 Jim Sandman (Vice Chair) - Ward 6
 Ricarda Ganjam - Ward 6

 Shukurat Adamoh-Faniyan - Ward 8
 Nick Rodriguez - Ward 6
 Shantelle Wright - Ward 8

Accountability
Under the School Reform Act, the Board is granted authority to hold DC public charter schools accountable for fulfilling their obligations under the Act. With a high proportion of PK-12 and adults in public charter schools, the Board created its first accountability tool, called the Performance Management Framework in 2011. It was developed to evaluate the performance of public charter schools  on common measures across all schools. Schools were rated Tier 1, 2, 3, with Tier 1 being the best. The framework also measured student achievement and student growth, indicators of readiness for high school and college, and mission-specific measures at each school. Due the COVID-19 pandemic, DC PCSB, is developing a new accountability framework that will focus on the learning outcomes for all DC students, especially those in historically marginalized groups, which is scheduled to pilot in the 2022-2023 school year.

2021-2024 Strategic Roadmap 

DC PCSB developed a Strategic Roadmap which guides the organization’s actions through school years 2021-2024, and emphasizes a commitment to focusing on equity and the District students charter schools serve. The Strategic Roadmap guides the organization’s work in three areas: 

Excellent Schools - ensuring internal decision-making responds to citywide needs and results in improved outcomes for all DC students, especially those in historically marginalized groups. 

Enduring Partnerships - strengthening relationships and partnerships with families, school communities, and residents.

Effective Organization - improving internal structure, processes, and culture to allow DC PCSB to create the conditions for student success in DC.

Enrollment 
DC public charter schools educate nearly half of DC’s public school students, in grades PK through 12 and adults. 

The number of students enrolled in public schools in Washington, DC during the 2021-22 school year increased slightly compared to 2020-21 enrollment, with 93,843 students enrolled in District public and public charter schools according to preliminary data released by the Office of the State Superintendent of Education (OSSE).

As of the 2021-22 school year, DC public charter schools enrolled a total of 45,251 students. The bulk of students were enrolled in grades PK 3-5, totaling 23,670 students. A total of 8,408 middle school students enrolled in grades 6-8, while 6,983 students enrolled in grades 9-12. DC public charter schools continue to educate the largest population of adult learners with 4,735 students enrolled in adult education programs in school year 2021-22. 

The ethnic breakdown of students enrolled in school year 2021-22 was 71% Black, 16.8% Hispanic (of any race), 7.6% non-Hispanic White, and 4.6% of other races.

Schools

Early Childhood Schools

Elementary and Middle schools

Middle schools

High schools

Alternative, Adult, and Vocational Education Schools

References

External links

 District of Columbia Public Charter School Board

Public education in Washington, D.C.
Government of the District of Columbia
1996 establishments in Washington, D.C.
Charter schools